Fakhrabad (also Romanized as Fakhrābād) is a village in Khusf Rural District, Central District, Khusf County, South Khorasan Province, Iran. At the 2006 census, its population was 145, in 48 families.

References 

Populated places in Khusf County